With Their New Face On is the fourth studio album by the Spencer Davis Group, the first to be released after the departure of Steve Winwood (to form the group Traffic), and his brother Muff Winwood. The album was released in 1968 in both the UK and the U.S. on the United Artists label.

Background

The new lineup of the band included existing members Davis and drummer Pete York, plus Eddie Hardin on vocals and keyboards and singer/guitarist Phil Sawyer. Hardin had been part of a band called A Wild Uncertainty. Sawyer had played in The Fleur de Lys and Shotgun Express.

The album did not sell as well as those from the Winwood era, failing to chart in the UK and America. However both singles from the album, "Time Seller" and "Mr. Second Class", charted on the UK charts at number 30 and number 35 respectively and were featured heavily on Tony Blackburn's Radio Caroline show. Sawyer would leave the band afterwards, replaced by Ray Fenwick. York would leave the band in 1969.

The album reflected a shift in musical style, expanding the band's pop/R&B roots to include the popular psychedelia of the time, along with Classical Music elements.

"Don't Want You No More" would be covered by The Allman Brothers Band on their self-titled 1969 debut album. The song had been released first as b-side to the 1967 "Time Seller" single and re-recorded for this album.

Track listing
All tracks written by Spencer Davis and Eddie Hardin except where noted.

Side one
"With His New Face On" - 3:20
"Mr. Second Class" - 3:16
"Alec in Transit Land" (Spencer Davis, Eddie Hardin, Kirk Duncan, Pete York) - 6:50
"Sanity Inspector" - 3:04
"Feel Your Way" - 2:59

Side two
"Morning Sun" (Davis, Hardin, Kirk Duncan, Nicky James) - 3:19
"Moonshine" (Davis, Hardin, York) - 2:41
"Don't Want You No More" - 3:16
"Time Seller" - 2:53
"Stop Me, I'm Falling" - 3:30

Personnel
 Phil Sawyer – lead guitar, lead vocal (track 4) and co-lead vocals (track 9)
 Ray Fenwick – lead guitar, lead vocals (track 8)
 Eddie Hardin – keyboards, lead vocals (tracks 1-3, 5-7, 9, 10)
 Spencer Davis – rhythm guitar, backing vocals
 Charlie McCracken – bass, backing vocals
 Pete York – drums, percussion

References

External links

1968 albums
The Spencer Davis Group albums
United Artists Records albums